Paye ta shnek (« paye ta chatte » in Alsacian argot) was a web site created in 2012 by Anaïs Bourdet that collected accounts of street harassment from women.

In 2013, the website published a book containing a selection of the testimonies. The book was published following a crowd fundraising effort and published by Fayard.

In June 2019, Bourdet announced that the site would stop being updated.

Bibliography

References 

Feminism in France
French-language websites
Harassment